South Iredell High School is a public school located near Troutman, North Carolina and is part of the Iredell-Statesville school system. South Iredell High is designated an Expected Growth School of Distinction by the North Carolina ABCs Accountability program. It educates students from surrounding areas including Troutman and south Statesville, North Carolina. The school was constructed in 1966 to replace Troutman High School. The school's enrollment was about 800 students in the 2005–2006 school year. Attendance was double that figure before 2002, when Lake Norman High School was created to alleviate South Iredell's overcrowding.
In 2018 the school's enrollment had grown to just under 1600 students.  The school has options for both traditional schooling and an IB (International Baccalaureate) Program. The school's mascot is the Viking and the school colors are navy blue and gold.

Television appearance 
South Iredell High School was the set for the 1989 made-for-television movie The Ryan White Story based on the life of 13-year-old AIDS patient Ryan White.

Athletics 
South Iredell High School has been in the North Piedmont Conference since the realignment for the 2017–2018 school year. South Iredell is Now apart of the 4A Classification and Plays in the Greater Metro 4A Conference with County Foes in Mooresville and Lake Norman

Wrestling 
From 1966 the team has been coached by North Carolina and National  Wrestling Hall of Fame Coach Bill Mayhew. He has also won the 1997 Wrestling USA North Carolina Man of the Year, second all-time in coaching wins in North Carolina with a current total of 703  which would rank him in the top six of all time nationally. In 1998 he was featured in the Faces in the crowd after the 1998 season when he won his 500th coaching match.

Football 
In the 2012 2AA State Championship football game, the South Iredell Vikings defeated the Carrboro Jaguars with a final score of 30–27. The team was led by Coach Scott Miller.

Volleyball 
In the 2015 the South Iredell Lady Vikings dominated over Asheboro high school in a 3–0 win for the 3A State Championship. The scores were 25–14, 25–11, and 25–9 for the three sets. South Iredell was ranked 24th in the nation and recognized by MaxPreps in the Tour of Champions. The team was led by head Coach Megan Skouby and assistant Coach Taylor Clendenin. The team had 7 seniors, 4 of which went on to play at the next level. Taylor Berg went to Limestone for volleyball and is now playing at UNC Charlotte for her sophomore year. Myla King went to Kent State and led her team with blocks her freshman season. Madison Peters ended up at UNC Wilmington for volleyball and played 19 matches in her freshman season. Julia Scoles went on to play at Chapel Hill. She was ACC Freshman of the Year in 2016 and was named to the 2017 U.S. Collegiate National Team. The other 3 seniors, (Ashley Batten - UNC-Charlotte, Kylie Rothwell - Fordham University, Anna Wagoner - UNC-Chapel Hill) went on to higher education. Batten and Wagoner played on their school's club teams.

Men's Soccer 
The South Iredell High School men's soccer team won back to back conference titles between 2018 and 2019. Both years they were coached by Curt Rogers. In 2018, the men's soccer team went 9-1 in the North Piedmont Conference, only losing to rival Statesville High School in their second matchup. Their overall record was 13-3-5. They went on to play in the NCHSAA 3A playoffs, keeping level with Monroe High School until overtime. They ended up falling 4-2.

In the 2019 season, South Iredell had 13 returning seniors. The men's soccer team leveled their now 4A rival Lake Norman by a score of 6-1 for the 4th game of their season. To start off their conference challenge, they played rival Statesville High School. They routed Statesville by a score of 6-0. They went on to finish conference play absolutely perfect, not allowing a single goal against them, scoring 45 goals, and going 10-0. They again went on to play in the NCHSAA 3A playoffs, this time as the #5 seed. In the first round they were matched against Erwin High School. Erwin traveled 2 hours from Asheville, NC to have play stopped short when South Iredell scored their 9th goal of the game, ending the game with a mercy rule early in the second half. In the second round, Hickory High School came to Viking Valley. After a very close game, it was decided by a single goal which was scored in the late first half. This was South Iredell's first goal against them in two months. The Vikings ended the season 18-3-2. Captains of the 2019 season were Ellison Johnson (senior), Benjamin Bograd (senior), and Matthew McConnell (senior).

For the 2019 season, Dylan Dellinger (senior) was awarded a spot on the 3A All-State team. Seven players were named to the 3A All-Region team: Ben Bograd (senior), Carter Cooke (senior), Dylan Dellinger (senior), Ellison Johnson (senior), Thomas Moreno (junior), Nate Piazza (senior), and Matt Robinson (junior). Four players were named to Iredell County's First All-County Team: Dylan Dellinger (senior), Ellison Johnson (senior), Nate Piazza (senior), and Ben Bograd (senior). Two players were named to Iredell County's Second All-County Team: Thomas Moreno (junior), and Carter Cooke (senior). They also had one honorable mention for All-County: Matt Robinson (junior). Seven players made the All-Conference team from South Iredell: Dylan Dellinger (senior), Ben Bograd (senior), Carter Cooke (senior), Ellison Johnson (senior), Thomas Moreno (junior), Nate Piazza (senior), and Matt Robinson (junior). Lastly, Dylan Dellinger (senior) was also awarded North Piedmont Conference player of the year.

Cross country 
The best Cross Country runner in South Iredell history is Gavin Mouat. He ran a school record 15:40 5k at the 2017 Hare and Hounds Invitational in Charlotte. He went on to attend NC State University but did not run in college. The girls team record is a 19:00 set by Giavanna Sirianni at the 2015 NCHSAA 3A West Regional. Both Mouat and Sirianni graduated in 2018. Math teacher and assistant baseball coach, David Bergen coached the team for the fall 2019 season and P.E. teacher, Marissa Wingate coached the team the 2 previous years.

Track and field 
The Head coach of both Indoor and Outdoor Track is Chemistry teacher, Stephen Schmal. Assistant coaches include Football coach, Scott Miller for Jumpers and some workouts in indoor and outdoor, Coach Cooney for distance in outdoor, Coach Chambers for throwers in outdoor, and Principal Ivey for pole vault in outdoor. Notable track runners include the aforementioned Gavin Mouat, Cory Gaither, and Olivia Cooney, all of whom graduated in 2018. Gaither runs at Davidson College and Cooney runs at Clemson University. Gaither led the state in the 300m Hurdles in 2018 with a time of 37.18. Cooney led the NCHSAA 3A class in the 400m Hurdles in 2017 with a time of 1:03.78.

Marching Band Accident
A concrete awning collapsed on October 3, 2015, on a group of South Iredell band students who had gathered outside a North Iredell High School shortly before a band competition, leaving 22 people injured.

References

External links 
 South Iredell High School website
 Iredell-Statesville Schools website
 North Carolina School Report Cards
 Official: 25 hurt in collapse of concrete awning at NC school

Public high schools in North Carolina
Schools in Iredell County, North Carolina